Gymnopholus is a genus of beetles in the family Curculionidae (true weevils) occurring in New Guinea. Many of them are notable for the growth of algae, diatoms, fungi, lichens and mosses on their backs(especially the subgenus Symbiopholus). The genus is divided into two subgenera (Gymnopholus and Symbiopholus) and contains the following species:

References

Entiminae
Taxonomy articles created by Polbot